The Elbert H. Gary was a  lake freighter.  She was Queen of the Lakes - the longest ship on the Great Lakes - when she was launched in 1905.

She was the first newly built vessel in the fleet of US Steel.

References

Queen of the Lakes
Merchant ships of the United States
Steamships of the United States
U.S. Steel